Neighbourhood Chef 2 is a cooking competition organised by MediaCorp and broadcast every Wednesday at 8:00 pm on Channel 8 in Singapore. Premiering 13 May 2015, Quan Yi Fong replaced Kym Ng as co-host. Mark Lee returns as main host in the second season. In celebrating the nation's SG50, contestants from different races and constituency come together to pit their cooking skills on a specific food ingredient of the week.

In each episode, hosts will shout out the show's slogan: In every neighborhood, there are neighborhood chefs.

The show sponsor's are: Giant Hypermarket, Sealy and Cuckoo Singapore.

Recruitment Exercise/Audition

Challenge
TV adverts will be broadcast around Singapore to promote each dish theme (2 dishes, e.g.: Cucumbers or Mango) and the location (Community Centers) for audition. Contestants will cook and prepare the dish at home and bring to the selected Community Centers for the celebrity chef judges for audition. After each audition only 4 will enter the finals for each dish theme.

During the finals, each episode's final 4 contestants will demonstrate on how to prepare the dish to the hosts and the 3 celebrity chef judges for critique. Each of the celebrity chef judge holds 25% of the total score, making it 75%. The other 25% of the scores will constitute from 10 residents living around Singapore. After tabulating the scores, the winner will take home $4,000 worth of cash and kitchen appliances and named the Neighborhood Chef. The other 3 contestants will walk away with $300 worth of kitchen appliances.

Episodes

Legend:
 Male  
 Female

External links
Official website
Episode list

Singaporean television series